Teploozyorsk is an urban locality (an urban-type settlement) in  Obluchensky District of the Jewish Autonomous Oblast, Russia. Population:

Geography
The settlement is located west of Londoko, at the southern end of the Bureya Range, near Mount Studencheskaya.

References

Urban-type settlements in the Jewish Autonomous Oblast